Sylveanus Augustus "Vean" Gregg (April 13, 1885 – July 29, 1964) was an American baseball player.  For three years, the left-hander was one of the most dominant pitchers in the major leagues.

Career
He threw 14 shutouts.

The next year, he played for the Cleveland Naps, going 23–7 with a league leading 1.80 ERA.  In 1912 and 1913, he started 34 games both years with an identical 20–13 record each season.

Gregg was traded to the Boston Red Sox in mid-1914. He developed a sore arm in 1914 and had continual arm problems for the rest of his career.

In December 1917, Connie Mack acquired Gregg for the Philadelphia Athletics.  He went 9–14 in 30 games in 1918 with a respectable 3.12 ERA for the last-place Athletics.  Gregg did not play baseball at any level from 1919 to 1921.

He returned to the Pacific Coast League in Seattle, Washington in 1922 and played there until 1924. In , he signed with the Washington Senators and went 2–2 with two saves after a 6-year absence from major league baseball. He later was inducted in the Pacific Coast League Hall of Fame.

Gregg's major league career record was 92–63 with a lifetime 2.70 ERA in 1,393 innings pitched and 720 strikeouts.  He was the only pitcher in the 20th century to win 20 games or more in his first three seasons.  His brother, Dave Gregg, pitched one inning in 1913 as Vean's teammate for the Cleveland Naps.

Vean Gregg died on July 29, 1964, in Aberdeen, Washington.

See also
 List of Major League Baseball annual ERA leaders

External links

Dave Gregg Biography

1885 births
1964 deaths
Baseball players from Washington (state)
Major League Baseball pitchers
American League ERA champions
Cleveland Naps players
Boston Red Sox players
Philadelphia Athletics players
Washington Senators (1901–1960) players
People from Chehalis, Washington
Spokane Indians players
Portland Beavers players
Buffalo Bisons (minor league) players
Providence Grays (minor league) players
Seattle Indians players
New Orleans Pelicans (baseball) players
Sacramento Senators players
South Dakota State Jackrabbits baseball players